Maré Airport  is an airport in Maré, New Caledonia.

Airlines and destinations

Statistics

References

Airports in New Caledonia